Respirator diplomacy of Taiwan refers to the exchange of masks between Taiwan and other countries, aimed to help the Global Coronavirus Response.

Background 

After the outbreak of COVID-19, the global demand for face masks increased rapidly. By the end of January 2020, the  Taiwanese Government pushed out a series of decisions on masks, included export restrictions, forced appropriation and investments, to allow Taiwan to become the second largest mask exporter globally. By March 2020, Taiwan successfully increased its production of face masks from 1.88 million to 10 million units per day, carried out rationing, and became the one of the largest markets for imports second only to Mainland China. In the middle of May, face mask production has increased to 20 million units per day.

It also launched a hospital ship through the Pacific, providing ventilators and masks to nations unable to obtain medical support from other sources, like Palau.

In July 2021, Taiwan donated 150,000 masks to the Brazilian state of Goiás.

Diplomatic endowment 
On 1 April 2020, President Tsai Ing-wen announced that Taiwan would donate 10 million masks to countries severely affected by the pandemic, including America and Europe, along with any other nation that has established full diplomatic relations with Taiwan.

According to the Taiwanese Foreign Ministry, as of July 2021, more than 54 million masks had been donated to over 80 countries since early 2020.

Reactions

Reactions from the European Union 
The President of the European Commission, Ursula von der Leyen, send a message on Twitter to thank the contributions made by Taiwan.

See also
 Medical diplomacy

References

Foreign relations of Taiwan
COVID-19 pandemic in Taiwan
Face masks during the COVID-19 pandemic